AFC Basingstoke was an English football based in Basingstoke. The club existed between 1993 and 2000, during which it made a meteoric rise up through the local football leagues.

Club history
Founded in 1993 as a pub side, George FC, the team entered the Basingstoke League, through which it rapidly climbed to quickly win promotion to the North Hants League.

After winning the North Hants League title, the club changed its name to AFC Basingstoke and successfully applied to join Division Three of the Hampshire League in 1996. In their second season in the league the club won the division to earn promotion to Division Two.

In 1999 the Hampshire League renamed its top flight the Premier Division, which would only accept clubs with floodlights and a fixed barrier. AFC Basingstoke moved to play at the old Portals Athletic ground near Overton, and after finishing sixth in Division Two in 1998–99, were accepted into the new Premier Division. However, the club's search for a new ground failed and after the loss of a sponsor the club withdrew from the competition in the summer of 2000 and folded.

Alan Goulding was the club's all-time top goal scorer with 100 goals in all competitions for the club.

Honours
Hampshire League
Division 3 champions 1997/98
North Hants League
Champions 1995/96
Basingstoke & District League
Premier Division Champions 1993/94
North Hants FA May Cup
Winners 1994/95

League records

References

Defunct football clubs in England
Association football clubs established in 1993
Association football clubs disestablished in 2000
Defunct football clubs in Hampshire
1993 establishments in England
2000 disestablishments in England
Sport in Basingstoke
Basingstoke and District Football League
North Hants League
Hampshire League